Allahyarlı is a village and municipality in the Beylagan Rayon of Azerbaijan. It has a population of 671.

References

Populated places in Beylagan District